The United Nations Educational, Scientific and Cultural Organization (UNESCO) designates World Heritage Sites of outstanding universal value to cultural or natural heritage which have been nominated by countries which are signatories to the UNESCO World Heritage Convention, established in 1972. Cultural heritage consists of monuments (such as architectural works, monumental sculptures, or inscriptions), groups of buildings, and sites (including archaeological sites). Natural features (consisting of physical and biological formations), geological and physiographical formations (including habitats of threatened species of animals and plants), and natural sites which are important from the point of view of science, conservation or natural beauty, are defined as natural heritage. North Korea, officially the Democratic People's Republic of Korea, ratified the convention on 21 July 1998.

, North Korea has two sites on the list. The Complex of Koguryo Tombs was listed in 2004, and Historic Monuments and Sites in Kaesong in 2013. In addition, North Korea has five sites on its tentative list.

World Heritage Sites

Tentative list
Caves in Kujang Area (2000)
Historical Relics in Pyongyang (2000)
Mt. Chilbo (2000)
Mt. Kumgang and the Relics in and around the Mountain (2000)
Mt. Myohyang and the Relics in and around the Mountain (2000)

References

World Heritage Sites in North Korea
North Korea
Lists of tourist attractions in North Korea